De Vrouw 1813–1913 (The Woman 1813-1913) was an exhibition held in 1913 in Amsterdam celebrating the 100th anniversary of liberation of the Netherlands from French occupiers in 1813.  It highlighted the achievements of women through the century following liberation.

De Vrouw 1813–1913 followed the successful 1898 feminist exhibition Nationale Tentoonstelling van Vrouwenarbeid (National Exhibition of Women's Labor). De Vrouw 1813–1913 was organized by Mia Boissevain and Rosa Manus. Presented in the style of the popular turn-of-the-century World's Fairs, it was hoped that the exhibition would further the cause of Dutch women's suffrage. It included information on the women's movement and women's place in Dutch society. As well as political and social information, the exhibit displayed visual arts, literature, and drama. The exhibition had a conference hall where there were weekly lectures on feminist topics.

There were about 300,000 visitors to the exhibition. Queen Wilhelmina visited the exhibition twice, first in May and again in August.

References

External links

Further reading
Archive Exhibition De Vrouw 1813 - 1913 Inventory list (pdf)
De Vrouw 1813-1913-2013 Special edition of the BMGN: Low Countries Historical Review

Exhibitions in the Netherlands
History of women in the Netherlands
Art in Amsterdam
1913 in art